Petronella de la Court (born 24 August 1624 in Leiden, South Holland - died 22 March 1707 in Amsterdam) was a Dutch art collector.

De la Court married her cousin, the silk merchant Adam Oortmans, on 24-8-1649 in Leiden, and they had 10 children together. They lived in the Stilsteeg. In 1657 the couple Oortmans-De la Court bought the brewery "De Zwaan" on the Singel in Amsterdam, located where the Bungehuis is situated today.

She is best known for her dollhouse, currently in the collection of the Centraal Museum, Utrecht.

References

Further reading
Van der Hut, Margreet: Het kunstkabinet van Petronella de la Court: De verzamelingen van een zeventiende-eeuwse mecenas, Zaandijk: Casae, 2021 (Karel van Mander Academy, KVMA Reeks voor Visueel Erfgoed in Nederland, 5), ISBN 978-90-831031-3-6.
Van der Hut, Margreet: Het poppenhuis van Petronella de la Court in het Centraal Museum Utrecht, Zaandijk: Casae, 2020 (Karel van Mander Academy, KVMA Reeks voor Visueel Erfgoed in Nederland, 3), ISBN 978-90-831031-0-5.

1624 births
1707 deaths
People from Leiden
Art collectors from Amsterdam
17th-century Dutch businesswomen
17th-century Dutch businesspeople